Berlin memorial plaque is a special form of commemorative plaque, made by the Royal Porcelain Factory, in Berlin that was introduced in 1985 in preparation for the city's 750th anniversary in 1987. The factory logo is present at the base of the panel, in the form of a cobalt blue sceptre. The design was determined in a competition that was won by the graphic artist Wieland Schütz.

History
As early as the 19th century, the Berlin Magistrate began to erect commemorative plaques and commemorative signs for people and events in the public spaces. For example, for the year 1930, the list includes 59 commemorative plaques in the inner district alone and a further 47 copies in all other districts of Berlin were hung. In the 20th century, uniform representations were sought and the Berlin plaque was developed.

Chronology

1985–1991
Originally, the design of the plaque cost Deutsche Marks. According to the plans at the time, each district of West Berlin would receive about 25 plaques, sponsored by the Sparkasse of Berlin.

The first three plaques were placed on 22 October 1985.

1992–2000
After the Peaceful Revolution the memorial plaque program was extended to the East Berlin, with the Sparkasse again paying the costs of the program. A total of 350 panels, now worth 3,000 marks per table, were planned by the year 2000. The technical supervision of the new project was taken over by the Historical Commission of Berlin. 

By the turn of the century, the funds provided by the Sparkasse had been exhausted.

From 2000
After the turn of the century, it was decided that an applicant must make a payment of 2500 Euro's, gain permission from the owner of the property where the plaque is to be placed and gain permission from the district council before proceeding with the placement of the plaque. Once that is completed, the Historical Commission of Berlin will drawn up an agreement with the applicant, to ensure it appropriate. 
Wieland Schütz then provides the graphic implementation of the text, partly with further design features. The final pressure on the board is done by the KPM. Finally, the applicant ensures that the plaque is affixed correctly, which will then become the property of the respective district office.

Gallery
Examples of some Berlin memorial plaques:

Literature

References

External links
  – Official site

Monuments and memorials in Berlin